This is a list of number one songs on the Billboard Hot Latin Songs chart by year:

List of number-one Billboard Top Latin Songs from the 1980s
List of number-one Billboard Hot Latin Tracks of 1990
List of number-one Billboard Hot Latin Tracks of 1991
List of number-one Billboard Hot Latin Tracks of 1992
List of number-one Billboard Hot Latin Tracks of 1993
List of number-one Billboard Hot Latin Tracks of 1994
List of number-one Billboard Hot Latin Tracks of 1995
List of number-one Billboard Hot Latin Tracks of 1996
List of number-one Billboard Hot Latin Tracks of 1997
List of number-one Billboard Hot Latin Tracks of 1998
List of number-one Billboard Hot Latin Tracks of 1999
List of number-one Billboard Hot Latin Tracks of 2000
List of number-one Billboard Hot Latin Tracks of 2001
List of number-one Billboard Hot Latin Tracks of 2002
List of number-one Billboard Hot Latin Tracks of 2003
List of number-one Billboard Hot Latin Tracks of 2004
List of number-one Billboard Hot Latin Songs of 2005
List of number-one Billboard Hot Latin Songs of 2006
List of number-one Billboard Hot Latin Songs of 2007
List of number-one Billboard Hot Latin Songs of 2008
List of number-one Billboard Hot Latin Songs of 2009
List of number-one Billboard Top Latin Songs of 2010
List of number-one Billboard Top Latin Songs of 2011
List of number-one Billboard Top Latin Songs of 2012
List of number-one Billboard Hot Latin Songs of 2013
List of number-one Billboard Hot Latin Songs of 2014
List of number-one Billboard Hot Latin Songs of 2015
List of number-one Billboard Hot Latin Songs of 2016
List of number-one Billboard Hot Latin Songs of 2017
List of number-one Billboard Hot Latin Songs of 2018
List of number-one Billboard Hot Latin Songs of 2019
List of number-one Billboard Hot Latin Songs of 2020
List of number-one Billboard Hot Latin Songs of 2021

External links
Current Hot Latin Songs chart. Billboard.com.